Elsie Wagstaff (1 July 1899 –  16 July 1985) was an English actress. Educated at the Guildhall School of Music, her stage work began in the chorus in 1919, and one of her first leading roles was as Sadie Thompson in an adaptation of Somerset Maugham's Rain. In 1928, she appeared on Broadway in John Van Druten's Diversion, and in Arnold Ridley and Bernard Merivale's The Wrecker. She also worked sporadically in films, and with some regularity on television.

Selected filmography

 Cotton Queen (1937) as Emily (uncredited)
 John Halifax (1938) as Jael
 Lassie from Lancashire (1938) as Aunt Hetty
 Trouble Brewing (1939) as Mrs. Hopkins
 Crimes at the Dark House (1940) as Mrs. Catherick
 The Dark Tower (1943) as Eve
 Headline (1944) as Mrs Daly
 Welcome, Mr. Washington (1944) as Miss Jones
 Meet Sexton Blake (1945) as Mrs. Baird
 Old Mother Riley at Home (1945) as Mrs. Ginochie
 Appointment with Crime (1946) as Mrs. Wilkins
 The Interrupted Journey (1949) as Wilding's Maid
 Celia (1949) as Aunt Nora
 Eight O'Clock Walk (1954) as Mrs Peskitt
 The End of the Affair (1955) as Bendrix Landlady
 You Pay Your Money (1957) as Ada Seymour
 Barnacle Bill (1957) as Mrs Gray
 Saturday Night and Sunday Morning (1960) as Mrs Seaton
 The Snake Woman (1961) as Aggie Harker
 Whistle Down the Wind (1961) as Auntie Dorothy
Dr. Syn, Alias the Scarecrow (1963) as Mrs. Ransley
 Heavens Above! (1963) as Lady on Parish Church Council
 Frankenstein and the Monster from Hell (1974) as Wild one

References

External links
 

1899 births
1985 deaths
Actresses from London
British stage actresses
British film actresses
British television actresses
20th-century British actresses
Alumni of the Guildhall School of Music and Drama
20th-century English women
20th-century English people